The Steve Biko Foundation launched the Steve Biko Memorial Lecture in 2000.

The 11th Annual Steve Biko Memorial Lecture
12 September 2010 marked the 33rd anniversary of the murder of Steve Biko. In commemoration, the Steve Biko Foundation hosted Professor Alice Walker, the Pulitzer Prize-winning author of The Color Purple, in South Africa for a series of events to celebrate the life and works of Steve Biko.

The 33rd anniversary commemoration consisted of two events. The first. "An Evening with Alice Walker", took place on 7 September at the State Theatre in Pretoria. Along with readings by Professor Walker, the event featured South African artists.  The second component was the  11th Annual Steve Biko Memorial Lecture, held at Jameson Hall at the University of Cape Town on Thursday 9 September.

Past speakers
Since the year 2000 the lecture has been delivered annually by the following speakers.

Excerpts from the Steve Biko Memorial Lectures Book
"A young man with a sharp intellect and flair for organisation and leadership, Biko realised the need to raise the sagging morale of black people, to raise their consciousness and self-esteem; in his own words to 'overcome the psychological oppression of black people by whites'." -Chinua Achebe

"Steve Biko, whom we have come to honour, is among this great gallery of people whose work and devotion have impacted those beyond the native shores, and which make it possible for us even to talk about the possibilities of a new Africa out of the colonial ashes of latter-day empires." - Ngũgĩ wa Thiong'o

"History from time to time, brings to the fore the kind of leaders who seize the moment,who cohere the wishes and inspirations of the oppressed.Such was Steve Biko,a fitting product of his time;a proud representative of the reawakening of a people."- Nelson Mandela

See also
 The Steve Biko Foundation

References

External links
 The Steve Biko Foundation
 The Steve Biko Foundation blog
 The Steve Biko Foundation on Twitter
 The Steve Biko Foundation on Facebook
 The 11th Annual Steve Biko Memorial Lecture delivered by Professor Alice Walker

Biko
Recurring events established in 2000
2000 establishments in South Africa
University of Cape Town
University of South Africa